The ice hockey team rosters at the 1972 Winter Olympics consisted of the following players:

Czechoslovakia
Head coach: Vladimír Kostka

Assistant coach: Jaroslav Pitner

Finland
Head coach: Seppo Liitsola

Assistant coach: Rauli Virtanen

Japan
Head coach:  Nikolai Karpov

Assitant coach: Masami Tanabu

Norway
Head coach:  Åke Brask

Poland
Head coach:  Anatoli Yegorov

Assistant coach: Mieczysław Chmura

Soviet Union
Head coach: Arkadi Chernyshyev

Assistant coach: Anatoly Tarasov, Boris Kulagin

Sweden
Head coach:  Billy Harris

Assistant coach: Björn Norell

Switzerland
Head coach:  Gaston Pelletier

Assistant coach:  Derek Holmes

United States
Kevin Ahearn, Charles Brown, Henry Boucha, Keith Christiansen, Mike Curran, Robbie Ftorek, Mark Howe, Stu Irving, Jim McElmury, Dick McGlynn, Tom Mellor, Ronald Naslund, Wally Olds, Frank Sanders, Craig Sarner, Pete Sears, Timothy Sheehy

West Germany
Toni Kehle, Heiko Antons, Georg Kink, Rainer Makatsch, Otto Schneitberger, Josef Völk, Werner Modes, Paul Langner, Rudi Thanner, Karl-Heinz Egger, Rainer Philipp, Bernd Kuhn, Reinhold Bauer, Johann Eimannsberger, Lorenz Funk, Erich Kühnhackl, Alois Schloder, Anton Hofherr, Hans Rothkirch, Martin Wild

Yugoslavia
Božidar Beravs, Slavko Beravs, Albin Felc, Anton Jože Gale, Gorazd Hiti, Rudi Hiti, Ivo Jan, Jože Bogomir Jan, Rudi Knez, Bojan Kumar, Silvo Poljanšek, Janez Puterle, Ivo Ratej, Viktor Ravnik, Boris Renaud, Drago Savić, Štefan Seme, Roman Smolej, Viktor Tišler, Franci Žbontar

References

Sources

Hockey Hall Of Fame page on the 1972 Olympics

rosters
1972